Gosthana may refer to:

Gosthani River, a river located in southern India
Hotan, also known as Gosthana, a city in Hotan Prefecture, Xinjiang, China
Hotan County, also known as Gosthana County, a county in Hotan Prefecture, Xinjiang, China
Hotan Prefecture, also known as Gosthana Prefecture. Located in Xinjiang, China
Kingdom of Khotan, also known as the Kingdom of Gosthana which flourished in the first millennium CE
Hotan River, also known as the Gosthana River, a river in north China. 
Yutian County, Xinjiang, county in Gosthana Prefecture (Hotan Prefecture), Xinjiang, China